The Ukrainian Radical Party, (URP), (Ukrajinśka Radykaľna Partija)  founded in October 1890 as Ruthenian-Ukrainian Radical Party and based on the radical movement in western Ukraine dating from the 1870s, was the first modern Ukrainian political party with a defined program, mass following, and registered membership. It advocated socialism, increased rights for Ukrainian peasants, and secularism.

Programme and Ideology

The Radical Party ideology was based on the political thought of Mykhailo Drahomanov, an eastern Ukrainian thinker who spent part of the nineteenth century in western Ukraine.  Although the Radical party advocated socialism in its ideology, it considered itself different from western socialists who were beholden to the ideas of Karl Marx because western socialism was based on the industrial proletariat while the Radical party was focused on the peasantry.  Accordingly, its socialism was agrarian and peasant-based.  The Ukrainian Radical party claimed kinship and affinity with the similarly peasant-based socialist Serbian Radical Party of the late nineteenth and early twentieth centuries. It actively opposed the influence of the Ukrainian Greek Catholic Church and its priests in Ukrainian society. It was also opposed to the Austrian government, to mainstream Ukrainophiles who were loyal to Austria, and to Ukrainian attempts to cooperate with Polish authorities.  At the same time, the URP cooperated with Polish workers and peasants. The URP supported Ukrainian independence at a party congress in 1895, the first time that the goal of an independent Ukrainian state had been expressed anywhere. Involved with the plight of the Ukrainian peasants, the URP also called for and organized strikes of Ukrainian agricultural workers.

History

The Radical Party was founded in Lviv on October 4, 1890 by a group of Ukrainian activists including the poet Ivan Franko, the publisher Mykhailo Pavlyk, and others. It was involved in founding reading rooms and cooperatives, organizing women's groups, and training and politicizing Ukrainian peasants.  In 1895, the party passed a resolution calling for Ukrainian independence.  That same year, it sent three representatives to the Galician Diet and in 1897 two representatives to the Austrian parliament.

In the mid-1890s three competing groups emerged within the URP.  One maintained its allegiance to the traditional ideology of the URP.  Another faction turned more to western European socialism and Marxism.  A third faction which included most of the Radical Party's most prominent members such as Ivan Franko became increasingly disenchanted with socialist ideas and more focussed on national concerns.  In 1899 the latter two groups left the Radical Party.  The socialist-learning faction split off to form the Ukrainian Social Democratic Party.  The nationalist-leading faction merged with mainstream Ukrainiphiles to create the National Democratic Party, which was the largest Ukrainian political party in Austrian-ruled Ukraine before and during the first world war.  The National Democratic party, renamed the Ukrainian National Democratic Alliance, would continue to dominate western Ukrainian political life until the Second World War.

After the exodus of the Ukrainian Social Democrats and the National Democrats, the remaining Ukrainian Radical Party, having become a definitively peasant-oriented party, was the second largest political party among ethnic Ukrainians in western Ukraine. In 1911, it sent five members to the Austrian parliament and in 1913 six members to the Galician Diet. On the eve of World War I, the Radical party established sporting societies and paramilitary groups that would serve as the basis for the Ukrainian Sich Riflemen, an all-Ukrainian unit within the Austrian army.

The Ukrainian Radical Party was one of the founding parties of the West Ukrainian National Republic, and its members occupied the posts of defence minister (Dmytro Vitovsky) and interior secretary within the West Ukrainian government.   Following the war, when western Ukraine became part of the Polish state, at a party congress in 1925 the Radical Party passed a resolution simultaneously opposing cooperation with Ukrainian "bourgeois parties" and condemning Bolsheviks policies in Soviet Ukraine. A year later, it merged with a socialist party and renamed itself the Ukrainian Socialist Radical Party (USRP).  In the 1928 Polish elections, the party received 280,000 votes, the second most among western Ukrainian parties following the Ukrainian National Democratic Alliance's 600,000 votes. This enabled the USRP to send 11 representatives into the parliament and 3 into the senate. In the 1931 elections it ran in a coalition with the Ukrainian National Democratic Alliance and obtained 1/4 of the coalition's seats. The USRP boycotted all subsequent Polish elections.

The party was a member of the Labour and Socialist International between 1931 and 1940.

After the Soviets annexed western Ukrainian territory in 1939, the USRP like all other western Ukrainian political parties was forced by the Soviet authorities to disband. Members of the party supported the Ukrainian national government of 1941 and two of its leaders (Volodymyr Lysy and Konstantyn Pankivsky) had positions in it as Minister and Deputy Minister of the Interior. The government was quickly disbanded by the Germans. 

In 1946 the USRP was re-established in exile and in 1948 it took part in the establishment of the Ukrainian National Rada in exile. In 1950, the party merged with the Ukrainian Social Democratic Labour Party and the Ukrainian Socialist-Revolutionary Party into the Ukrainian Socialist Party.

Elections

Austria-Hungary

See also
Ukrainian National Democratic Alliance

References
Inline:

1890 establishments in Austria-Hungary
1939 disestablishments in Ukraine
Agrarian parties in Poland
Agrarian parties in Ukraine
Anti-clerical parties
Defunct agrarian political parties
Defunct socialist parties in Poland
Defunct socialist parties in Ukraine
Establishments in the Kingdom of Galicia and Lodomeria
History of socialism
Left-wing nationalist parties
Members of the Labour and Socialist International
Nationalist parties in Poland
Nationalist parties in Ukraine
Political parties established in 1890
Political parties of minorities in Poland
Political parties of the Russian Revolution
Political parties with year of disestablishment missing
Radical parties
Ukrainian People's Republic
Ukrainian political parties in Austria-Hungary
Ukrainian political parties in Poland